Power is the third and final studio album by Q and Not U. It was released on October 5, 2004. After touring in support of the album, the group disbanded in September 2005. The album was co-produced by Pete Cafarella and Rafael Cohen (of Supersystem).  All tracking was done at The Love Story in Brooklyn, NY.  The album was mixed with Don Zientara at Inner Ear Studio and mastered by Chad Clark at Silver Sonya.

Track listing

References

2004 albums
Dischord Records albums
Q and Not U albums